Bucculatrix helichrysella is a moth in the family Bucculatricidae. It was described by Alexandre Constant in 1889. It is found in southern Europe, where it has been recorded from France, the Iberian Peninsula, Corsica, Sardinia and North Macedonia.

The wingspan is about 7 mm.

The larvae feed on Helichrysum italicum. They mine the leaves of their host plant. Larvae can be found in April.

References

Natural History Museum Lepidoptera generic names catalog

Bucculatricidae
Moths described in 1889
Moths of Europe
Leaf miners